Lectionary 962 (ℓ 962 in the Gregory-Aland numbering), is a Greek-Coptic uncial manuscript of the New Testament. Paleographically it has been assigned to the 8th century.

Description 
The codex contains a small parts of the Gospel of Mark 14:65-67,68-71; 14:72-15:2,4-7, on 1 parchment leaf (16 cm by 13.5 cm). It is written in two columns per page, 20 lines per page, in uncial letters. 

Currently it is dated by the INTF to the 8th century.
It was added to the list of the New Testament manuscripts by Kurt Aland, who gave him siglum 0276. Since second edition of Kurzgefasste it is catalogued as lectionary (ℓ 962).

Location 
Currently the codex is housed at the Louvre (10039b) in Paris.

See also 

 List of New Testament uncials
 Coptic versions of the Bible
 Biblical manuscripts
 Textual criticism

References 

Greek-Coptic diglot manuscripts of the New Testament
Greek New Testament uncials
8th-century biblical manuscripts